Beatrice Chinery known as Miliky MiCool ( – June 10, 2020) was a Ghanaian actress. She rose to fame in the early 2000s for her role in the television series Kejetia, and later featured in Yolo.

Career 
She began her acting career in 1993. MiCool played a role in the popular television series Kejetia in the early 2000s. She went on to feature in other movies including Jamestown Fisherman and Yolo.

Death 
MiCool died from complications of hypertension at Korle-Bu Teaching Hospital in Accra on June 10, 2020. MiCool's brother Robert stated that she had been ill for some months but things got worse and she was rushed to the Hospital but died upon arrival.

Filmography
 Kejetia
 Yolo
 Jamestown Fisherman

References 

1960s births
2020 deaths
Deaths from hypertension
Ghanaian actresses
Ghanaian comedians
Ghanaian women comedians
Year of birth missing